New Star Basketball Club is a Burundian basketball club. The team plays in the National League of Burundi, and has won the championship in 2021. One of New Stars' most notable players has been Guibert Nijimbere.

Basketball Africa League
New Star qualified for the 2022 BAL Qualifying Tournaments. There, New Star won its first four games. The winning streak was finally stopped in the semi-finals by South Sudan's Cobra Sport who won the decisive match 78-76.

Honours
Burundian Championship
Champions: 2018, 2021

In African competitions
BAL Qualifiers (1 appearance)
2022 – Fourth Place

Players

Current roster 
The following is the New Star BBC roster for the second round of the 2022 BAL qualification.

Notable players
 Guibert Nijimbere (3 years: 2014–2017)

References

External links
New Star at AfroBasket.com

Basketball teams in Burundi
Bujumbura
Basketball teams established in 2002
2002 establishments in Burundi

Road to BAL teams